The Mou River or the Oué Pouémaeu is a river of northeastern New Caledonia. It has a catchment area of 58 square kilometres.

See also
List of rivers of New Caledonia

References

Rivers of New Caledonia